Kije  is a village in the administrative district of Gmina Sulechów, within Zielona Góra County, Lubusz Voivodeship, in western Poland.

During the Seven Years' War on 23 July 1759 it was the site of the Battle of Kay, where Prussian Army forces under Lieutenant General Carl Heinrich von Wedel fought against the Imperial Russian Army led by Pyotr Saltykov.

References

Kije